Khamis Al Hammadi (Arabic:خميس الحمادي) (born 11 August 1998) is an Emirati footballer. He currently plays as a left back for Baniyas.

Career
Al Hammadi started his career at Baniyas and is a product of the Baniyas's youth system. On 8 May 2015, Al Hammadi made his professional debut for Baniyas against Al Wahda in the Pro League . landed with Baniyas from the UAE Pro League to the UAE First Division League in 2016-17 season. ended up with Baniyas from the UAE First Division League to the UAE Pro League in the 2017-18 season.

References

External links
 

1998 births
Living people
Emirati footballers
Baniyas Club players
UAE Pro League players
UAE First Division League players
Association football fullbacks
Place of birth missing (living people)